In financial econometrics, an autoregressive conditional duration (ACD, Engle and Russell (1998)) model considers irregularly spaced and autocorrelated intertrade durations. ACD is analogous to GARCH. Indeed, in a continuous double auction (a common trading mechanism in many financial markets) waiting times between two consecutive trades vary at random.

Definition
Specifically, let  denote the duration 
(the waiting time between consecutive trades) and
assume that , where
the series  is given by

, .

References

 Robert F. Engle and J.R. Russell. "Autoregressive Conditional Duration: A New Model for Irregularly Spaced Transaction Data", Econometrica, 66:1127-1162, 1998.
 N. Hautsch. "Modelling Irregularly Spaced Financial Data", Springer, 2004.

Time series
Mathematical finance